Samlin Malngiang is a Hill State People's Democratic Party politician from Meghalaya. He has been elected in Meghalaya Legislative Assembly election in 2018 from Sohiong constituency as candidate of Hill State People's Democratic Party. He was Minister of Public Health Engineering, Secretariat Administration, Legal Metrology in Conrad Sangma ministry from 2018.

References 

Living people
Hill State People's Democratic Party politicians
Meghalaya MLAs 2018–2023
Year of birth missing (living people)
People from East Khasi Hills district